Peuma or Peumata (Πεῦματα) was a polis (city-state) of Phthiotis in ancient Thessaly. It appears documented in an inscription at Delphi that records a border conflict among Peuma, Melitaea. Peuma is also cited as having a border dispute with Phyliadon also settled by neutral arbitration.

Peuma minted bronze coins that have been preserved which have been dated  with the inscription «ΠΕΥΜΑΤΙΩΝ». Its site is identified with remains located at the hilltop east of the village  in the Municipality of Pharsala.

References

Populated places in ancient Thessaly
Former populated places in Greece
Achaea Phthiotis
Thessalian city-states